Carlos Gabriel González Espínola (born 4 February 1993) is a Paraguayan professional footballer who plays as a forward for Liga MX club Toluca and the Paraguay national team.

Club career
Born in Villarrica, Paraguay, he started his career in Nacional Asunción youth set-up aged 16. However, in the 2013 summer González joined Chilean club Magallanes of the second-tier. At the Carabeleros he was two-times Primera B goalscorer with twelve goals (2013-14 and 2014-15).

In 2015, he joined Chilean first-tier club Santiago Wanderers to replace Roberto Gutiérrez (team’s goalscorer the last season) who left the Valparaíso-based side for powerhouse Universidad Católica. After an irregular start only playing 10 games and not scoring goals, he scored his first in a 2015 Copa Chile match against San Luis Quillota netting the game’s first goal in a 1–1 draw.

International career
On 2 March 2019, González received a call-up to the Paraguay national team from Eduardo Berizzo ahead of that month's friendlies with Peru and Mexico. He made his debut for Paraguay on 26 March 2019 in a friendly against Mexico, as a starter.

Honours

Necaxa
Copa MX: Clausura 2018

References

External links

 

1993 births
Living people
Paraguayan footballers
Paraguayan expatriate footballers
Paraguay international footballers
Primera B de Chile players
Chilean Primera División players
Liga MX players
Magallanes footballers
Santiago Wanderers footballers
San Marcos de Arica footballers
C.D. Huachipato footballers
Cruz Azul footballers
Club Necaxa footballers
Expatriate footballers in Chile
Expatriate footballers in Mexico
Association football forwards